The Collier Shale is a geologic formation in the Ouachita Mountains of Arkansas and Oklahoma. Dating from the Late Cambrian to Early Ordovician periods, the Collier Shale is the oldest stratigraphic unit exposed in Arkansas. First described in 1892, this unit was not named until 1909 by Albert Homer Purdue in his study of the Ouachita Mountains of Arkansas. Purdue assigned the type locality to the headwaters of Collier Creek in Montgomery County, Arkansas, but did not designate a stratotype. As of 2017, a reference section for this unit has yet to be designated.

Paleofauna

Conodonts

 Acanthodus
 A. lineatus
 Acodus
 A. oneotensis
 Chosonodina
 C. herfurthi
 Cordylodus
 C. angulatus
 Drepanodus
 D. subarcuatus

 Loxodus
 L. bransoni
 Oistodus
 O. triangularis
 Paltodus
 P. bassleri
 Phakelodus
 P. tenuis

Trilobites

 Anechocephalus
 A. aphelodermus
 Apachia
 A. genaitholix
 Aphelotoxon
 A. lumaleasa
 Buttsia
 B. drabensis
 Cernuolimbus
 C. monilis
 Cheilocephalus
 C. brachyops

 Cliffia
 C. lataegenae
 C. magnacilis
 Comanchia
 C. amplooculata
 Dellea
 D. planafrons
 D. suada
 Erixanium
 E. lacunatum
 Housia
 H. vacuna
 Iddingsia
 I. hapsis

 Irvingella
 I. major
 Jessievillia
 J. radiatus
 Kindbladia
 K. wichitaensis
 Kymagnostus
 K. harti
 Linnarsonella
 L. girtyi
 Neoagnostus
 N. dilatus

 Parabolinoides
 P. contractus
 Pseudagnostus
 P. communis
 Pseudokingstonia
 P. exotica
 Pterocephalia
 P. sanctisabae
 Pulchricapitus
 P. fetosus
 Pyttstrigis
 P. dicilia
 Xenocheilos
 X. minutum

See also

 List of fossiliferous stratigraphic units in Arkansas
 Paleontology in Arkansas

References

 

Cambrian Arkansas
Cambrian southern paleotropical deposits
Ordovician Arkansas
Ordovician geology of Oklahoma